Euterpe broadwayi, the manac, or manicol, is a tall, slender-stemmed, pinnate-leaved palm native to Trinidad and Tobago, Grenada, Saint Vincent and the Grenadines and Dominica.  Stems usually grow in a cluster and are 8–20 metres tall and 20–25 centimetres in diameter and bear 10–16 leaves.

It is sometimes harvested for palm heart.

Description

Distribution
The species is found in Trinidad, Tobago, Grenada, St. Vincent and Dominica, on exposed mountain ridges and steep river valleys.

References

broadwayi
Trees of Trinidad and Tobago
Trees of Dominica
Taxa named by Odoardo Beccari